Benjamin DeKalbe Wood (November 10, 1894 –  July 6, 1986) was an American educator, researcher, and director / professor at Columbia University. He attended the University of Texas and graduated with a Bachelor of Arts (BA) degree in psychology. He then attended Columbia University and graduated with a Master of Arts (MA) degree, going on to get a PHD in psychology. He then started working at the University, first becoming an assistant professor. He then became an instructor and an assistant to the university dean. He became head of the university's research bureau and was an expert in the educational field.

Early life 

Wood was born in Brownsville, Texas, on November 10, 1894.  He attended the Brownsville area schools, Mission High School, and the University of Texas.

Mid life and career 

Wood attended University of Texas and graduated in 1917 with a BA in psychology. Wood then attended Columbia University in 1918 and graduated in 1922 with a MA degree in philosophy, and in 1923 received a doctor degree in philosophy from Columbia University. At Columbia he became an assistant to Dr. E. L. Thorndike, in 1919. In 1921, he became an instructor and an assistant to the university dean. Wood became head of Columbia's collegiate research bureau in 1927. He was ultimately promoted to full professorship of collegiate education research.

Wood served in the division of military psychology in World War I. He was a captain in military intelligence of the Officer Reserve Corps from 1924 to 1934. In World War II he was a consultant for the Civil Aeronautics Administration in the U.S. Office of Education and chairman of the joint advisory committee on aviation education. He recommended that all college instructors teach some sort of course in aviation. After that he was a consultant to the Air Force Academy planning board.

Wood found through a Pennsylvania statewide study, done from 1923 to 1930, of some 36,000 high school students and all the college students, that these students showed poor academic achievement when using a prescribed course system. Wood preferred objective testing as a way to measure achievement; that would mean the same information was taught every year by every teacher to every student. He wanted testing methods that would be specifically tailored for the students and to disregard college credits as a way of measuring academic achievement, as Wood believed these were just numbers that did not measure truly if a student could use logic and reasoning. Wood wanted students to formulate learning processes that would help the concept 'stick' with the student. He discouraged the idea of just getting the answer from the teacher. To demonstrate this, when Wood was a teacher, the method he used to teach a student was that when a student would ask a question he would rephrase it and ask it back to the student to make the student think what might be the correct answer.

The Pennsylvania Study sponsored by the Carnegie Foundation for the Advancement of Teaching caused Wood to urge the idea that there be an upgrade in standardization of the objectives and priorities of the teacher colleges. He argued that the first step to an improvement in higher education was to abandon the course credit system as a measuring instrument for academic progress. He pointed out how medical techniques had improved over the last 100 years and that this concept of technology improvement should be implemented in higher education.

Wood called high school instructing and teacher's colleges antiquated. He pointed out the main goal of most teachers was to go over their course material and to just have the student memorize the material without necessarily understanding it. Wood proclaimed the main purpose of a teacher should be to study the child and steer them in the right direction. He claimed that it had taken 2,000 years to appreciate Socrates's philosophy that a true learning experience comes from creative thinking and is where one truly receives an education. He proclaimed that curiosity was a 'precious gift' that should not be discouraged from a child since it is needed as part of their education.

Teaching and test scoring 

Wood had an interest in scoring tests automatically, instead of using clerks or teacher's time to tabulate the test results by hand. One argument Wood had was that in the old way of doing exams was for the teacher or professor to ask a question and the student to complete a lengthy written answer. This limited the number of questions in a timed examination, and therefore, only covered a small portion of the course's material. Additionally, the instructor then had to read over and grade the student's papers individually, a very time-consuming labor-intensive process. During Wood's time at Columbia, an experiment was done in 1919 where a standardization method of testing was tried. Instead of handwritten essay answers by the student, a new method of testing was devised which consisted of printed out pamphlets. The first part had a set of true or false statements and a mark next to it which was filled out by the student. The second part was multiple choice and the student could choose from a possible three or four answers. Since the answers to either part were exact, all the clerk had to do was score the test compared to a correct master template. This required no subject knowledge on the part of the clerk. Wood contended that in a 1921–22 session, this new method saved the staff many man-hours of labor and had more accurate results.

Wood was involved with the intelligence test measurement movement of the 1920s that started using the results from multiple-choice answers instead of essay exams. He was a pioneer in the propagation of standardized educational tests beginning in 1919. Wood helped design the multiple choice form of the pencil-in bubbles and the IBM Test Scoring Machine that was used to read these filled in forms, and was the first test scoring machine made commercially available. Wood endowed graduate student fellowships with earnings from the product.

Wood contacted various office-machine companies in 1929 to see if they had an interest in a possible mechanical solution to the extensive time spend on scoring tests by hand. IBM was the only company that showed an interest in the problem. He was contacted by Thomas J. Watson, the company president, that same year. Wood set up an all day meeting with Watson about the scoring problem. This unusually long meeting caused Watson to send trucks filled with punch-card machines and other equipment to Wood to establish Columbia's first computing laboratory, the Statistical Bureau of Collegiate Research. The success of the laboratory inspired Watson the next year to authorize the construction of a special mechanical computer, known as the "Difference Tabulator" or the 'Babbage-Scheutz-Wiberg instrument'. It was installed at Columbia University in 1931 and was referred to as the Columbia machine. It made possible, for the first time, uniform testing of student by the scoring of multiple choice answers. Wood ultimately become a longtime consultant to Watson on testing methods and scoring techniques.

Fill-in-the-bubble testing forms have become the 20th century tradition in testing practices and been in extensive use since the 1950s. Wood blamed standardized education why a college diploma told little about a teacher's real ability to teach a pupil to learn practical knowledge.

One of the earliest of applications of Wood's testing programs was sponsored by the American Institute of Accountants for the accounting field and measured students ability to become Certified Public Accountants or junior accountants. It measured interest, aptitude, and achievement capabilities and the results made available to accounting and business firms.

Wood pointed out that his testing techniques of the use of multiple-choice answers provided a scientific way of measuring a person's intelligence. He claimed that his testing techniques were 'all embracing' – the individualized field multiple choice tests covered all aspects of the subject given in college. This then made it a fairer way of seeing what the student learned from the course than just answering a specific question or fill in the blank questions.

Wood advocated the use of typewriters for children as early as possible as an excellent tool for learning writing quickly, which he demonstrated in 1930, in a three-year experiment with over 14,000 school children and 400 teachers in 50 elementary schools in 12 American cities. The children were divided into two groups, one set had typewriters and the other did everything just by writing. The experiment details and results were published in a book. One thing the experiment showed was that children could learn to type before they were able to develop writing skills. Children usually had trouble coordinating their fingers at an early age, therefore developed a dislike for writing. However, those that started with a typewriter were observed to get a head start in self-expression. Those that learned the use of typewriters had a much higher output of written material and quality of work than those that wrote by hand. Wood claimed that typing was 'glamorous' to school children. He said that the group of children that used the typewriters were much improved in spelling, grammar, and arithmetic. Wood observed that children as young as five years old could grasp the concept of typing; seven and eight-year-old children learned complicated punctuation with the use of typewriters. By the time this group was nine years old, the children in the experiment learned correct positioning of the fingers.

Later life and death 
Woods retired in 1960. He spent much time during his retirement trying to solve the problem of student reading failure. To this end, he tried to implement Sir James Pitman's phonemic initial teaching alphabet. In 1969, he was given the Teachers College Medal for Distinguished Service. He received a honorary doctor degree from Union College in New York, from Lawrence College in Wisconsin, and from Colorado State Teachers College. Wood died at the age of 91 of a heart attack on July 8, 1986.

Legacy 
Wood established the Elbenwood Fund for Education Research, the Ben D. Wood Fellowship Economic Fund and the Institute for Learning Technologies Fund. Twenty-six students had qualified through 2009.

Committees and societies 
 Member of Phi Beta Kappa.
 Member of the American Polar Society.
 Member of the curators of Stephens College.
 Director of Eastman's teaching film experiment.
 Member of the New York Academy of Sciences.
 Member of the American Psychological Association.
 Chairman or director of 20 national education committees.
 Director of the American Council of Education test service.
 Member of the New York state board of regents' examining board.
 Member of the American Association for the Advancement of Science.
 Member of committee of personnel of the American Institute of Accountants.
 Director of Commonwealth Fund research on measurement of achievement in college courses.

Works 
Wood wrote seven books during his lifetime.
 Measurement of College Work (1921)
Measurement of Law School (1924)
American History Test (1926)
Classroom Motion Pictures (1929)
Higher Education in Pennsylvania (1938)
Global Geography Textbook (1945)
Geography of the World (1949)

References

Sources 

1894 births
1986 deaths
20th-century American psychologists
Educational psychologists
Ethologists
American eugenicists
Teachers College, Columbia University alumni
Columbia University faculty
Teachers College, Columbia University faculty
People from Brownsville, Texas
University of Texas alumni
20th-century American zoologists